Miani, formerly Tani after a village name, is a Papuan language complex of Madang Province, Papua New Guinea. The northern and southern varieties, Miani and Maiani, are dialects in terms of vocabulary or pronunciation.

References

Kaukombaran languages
Languages of Madang Province